

Still cameras 
The following digital cameras allow photos to be taken and saved in at least one raw image format. Some cameras support more than one, usually a proprietary format and Digital Negative (DNG).

Agfa 
 Agfa ActionCam - MDC

Canon

Casio 
Exilim EX-ZR700
Exilim EX-ZR1000
Exilim EX-100

Fujifilm 
Fujifilm FinePix IS-Pro
Fujifilm FinePix S1 Pro
Fujifilm FinePix S2 Pro
Fujifilm FinePix S3 Pro
Fujifilm FinePix S5 Pro
Fujifilm FinePix S6500fd
Fujifilm FinePix S9100/9600
Fujifilm FinePix S9000/9500
Fujifilm FinePix 20 Pro
Fujifilm FinePix F700
Fujifilm FinePix F710
Fujifilm FinePix E550
Fujifilm FinePix E900
Fujifilm FinePix F550EXR
Fujifilm FinePix F600EXR
Fujifilm FinePix F810
Fujifilm FinePix HS10
Fujifilm FinePix HS20EXR
Fujifilm FinePix HS35EXR
Fujifilm FinePix HS30EXR
Fujifilm FinePix S100FS
Fujifilm FinePix S200EXR
Fujifilm FinePix S5100/5500
Fujifilm FinePix S5200/5600
Fujifilm FinePix S7000
Fujifilm FinePix HS50EXR
Fujifilm FinePix X10
Fujifilm X100 (X100, X100S, X100T)
Fujifilm FinePix X-S1
Fujifilm X-Pro1
Fujifilm X-E1
Fujifilm X-E2
Fujifilm X-E2s
Fujifilm X-E3
Fujifilm X-E4
Fujifilm X-M1
Fujifilm X-A1
Fujifilm X-A2
Fujifilm X-T1
Fujifilm X-T10
Fujifilm X-Pro2
Fujifilm X-Pro3
Fujifilm X-T2
Fujifilm X-T20
Fujifilm X-T3
Fujifilm X-T30
Fujifilm X-T4
Fujifilm X100F
Fujifilm X100V
Fujifilm X-H1
Fujifilm X-T100
Fujifilm XQ1

Imacon 
Imacon Ixpress

Hasselblad 
Hasselblad H series
Hasselblad CF series
Hasselblad CFV series
Hasselblad Lunar / Hasselblad Lunar Limited Edition - ARW 2.3.0 (CMOS, compressed)
Hasselblad Stellar / Hasselblad Stellar Special Edition - ARW 2.3.0 (CMOS, compressed)
Hasselblad Stellar II - ARW 2.3.1 (CMOS, compressed)
Hasselblad HV - ARW 2.3.1 (CMOS, compressed)
Hasselblad Lusso - ARW 2.3.1 (lossy delta-compression)

Kodak 
Kodak P712
Kodak P850
Kodak P880 saved in .KDC format
Kodak C603/C643 via hidden debug menu
Kodak C713 via hidden debug menu saved in .RAW format
Kodak DCS-620, -660 Canon bodies, 2 and 6 megapixels
Kodak DCS-720, -760 Nikon F5 bodies, 2 and 6 megapixels
Kodak DCS-14n
Kodak DCS Pro SLR/n
Kodak DCS Pro SLR/c
Kodak Z1015IS
Kodak EasyShare Z980
Kodak EasyShare Z990
Kodak PixPro S1

Konica 
Konica Digital Revio KD-400Z (MK77/2118) - undocumented raw image file mode, erroneously using the JPG file extension, convertible to MRW
Konica Revio KD-410Z (MK12) - undocumented raw image file mode, erroneously using the JPG file extension, convertible to MRW
Konica Revio KD-420Z (ML42) - undocumented raw image file mode, erroneously using the JPG file extension, convertible to MRW
Konica Digital Revio KD-500Z (MK86) - undocumented raw image file mode, erroneously using the JPG file extension, convertible to MRW
Konica Revio KD-510Z (ML22) - undocumented raw image file mode, erroneously using the JPG file extension, convertible to MRW

Konica Minolta 
Konica Minolta DiMAGE A2 (2720) - MRW
Konica Minolta DiMAGE A200 (2747) - MRW
Konica Minolta Dynax 5D / Konica Minolta Maxxum 5D / Konica Minolta α-5 Digital / Konica Minolta α Sweet Digital (2186) - MRW
Konica Minolta Dynax 7D / Konica Minolta Maxxum 7D / Konica Minolta α-7 Digital (2181) - MRW
Konica Minolta DiMAGE G530 (2736) - undocumented raw image file mode, erroneously using the JPG file extension, convertible to MRW
Konica Minolta DiMAGE G600 (2744) - undocumented raw image file mode, erroneously using the JPG file extension, convertible to MRW
Konica Minolta DiMAGE Z2 (2725, SX745) - unofficial hack to enable raw image file mode, using the JPG file extension, convertible to NEF

Kyocera 
Contax N Digital

Leaf 
Leaf Digital Backs

Leica 
Leica M8
Leica M8.2
Leica M9
Leica Digilux 2
Leica Digilux 3
Leica V-LUX 1
Leica D-LUX 3
Leica D-LUX 4
Leica D-LUX 5
Leica Digital Modul-R
Leica X1
Leica X2
Leica X Vario

Minolta 
Minolta RD-175 (2753) - MDC
Minolta DiMAGE 5 (2773) - MRW
Minolta DiMAGE 7 (2766) / Minolta DiMAGE 7UG - MRW
Minolta DiMAGE 7i (2779) - MRW
Minolta DiMAGE 7Hi (2778) - MRW
Minolta DiMAGE A1 (2782) - MRW
Minolta DiMAGE G400 (2732) - undocumented raw image file mode, erroneously using the JPG file extension, convertible to MRW
Minolta DiMAGE G500 (2731) - undocumented raw image file mode, erroneously using the JPG file extension, convertible to MRW

Nikon

Nikon Mirrorless series 
Nikon Z 9
Nikon Z 7II
Nikon Z7
Nikon Z 6II
Nikon Z6
Nikon Z5
Nikon Z fc
Nikon Z50

Nikon DSLR series 
Nikon D1
Nikon D1H
Nikon D1X
Nikon D2H
Nikon D2Hs
Nikon D2X
Nikon D2Xs
Nikon D3
Nikon D3S
Nikon D3X
Nikon D4
Nikon D4S
Nikon D40
Nikon D40x
Nikon D50
Nikon D60
Nikon D70/D70s
Nikon D80
Nikon D90
Nikon D100
Nikon D200
Nikon D300
Nikon D300s
Nikon D500
Nikon D600
Nikon D610
Nikon D700
Nikon D750
Nikon D800
Nikon D800E
Nikon D810
Nikon D810A
Nikon D850
Nikon D3000
Nikon D3100
Nikon D3200
Nikon D3300
Nikon D5000
Nikon D5100
Nikon D5200
Nikon D5300
Nikon D5500
Nikon D5600
Nikon D7000
Nikon D7100
Nikon D7200
Nikon D7500

Nikon MILC series 
Nikon 1 J1, September 21, 2011
Nikon 1 V1, September 21, 2011
Nikon 1 J2, August 10, 2012
Nikon 1 V2, October 24, 2012
Nikon 1 J3
Nikon 1 V3
Nikon 1 J4
Nikon 1 J5
Nikon 1 S1
Nikon 1 S2
Nikon 1 AW1

Nikon Coolpix series with at least 10 megapixels 
Nikon Coolpix A
Nikon Coolpix P6000
Nikon Coolpix P7000
Nikon Coolpix P7100
Nikon Coolpix P7700
Nikon Coolpix P7800
Nikon Coolpix P330
Nikon Coolpix P340

Nikon Coolpix series below 10 megapixels 
Nikon Coolpix 700 ("DIAG RAW" hack)
Nikon Coolpix 800 ("DIAG RAW" hack)
Nikon Coolpix 880 ("DIAG RAW" hack)
Nikon Coolpix 900 ("DIAG RAW" hack)
Nikon Coolpix 950 ("DIAG RAW" hack)
Nikon Coolpix 990 ("DIAG RAW" hack)
Nikon Coolpix 995 ("DIAG RAW" hack)
Nikon Coolpix 2100 ("DIAG RAW" hack)
Nikon Coolpix 2500 ("DIAG RAW" hack)
Nikon Coolpix 3200 ("DIAG RAW" hack)
Nikon Coolpix 3700 ("DIAG RAW" hack)
Nikon Coolpix 4300 ("DIAG RAW" hack)
Nikon Coolpix 4500 ("DIAG RAW" hack)
Nikon Coolpix 5000 (as of Firmware ver. 1.7 12/18/03)
Nikon Coolpix 5400
Nikon Coolpix 5700
Nikon Coolpix 8400
Nikon Coolpix 8700
Nikon Coolpix 8800
Nikon Coolpix S6 ("DIAG RAW" hack)

Olympus 
Olympus C-5050Z
Olympus C-5060WZ
Olympus C-8080WZ
Olympus C-7000
Olympus E-1
Olympus E-3
Olympus E-5
Olympus E-10
Olympus E-20
Olympus E-30
Olympus E-300
Olympus E-330
Olympus E-400
Olympus E-410
Olympus E-420
Olympus E-450
Olympus E-500
Olympus E-510
Olympus E-520
Olympus E-600
Olympus E-620
Olympus OM-D E-M1
Olympus OM-D E-M1 Mark II
Olympus OM-D E-M1 Mark III
Olympus OM-D E-M1X
Olympus OM-D E-M5
Olympus OM-D E-M5 Mark II
Olympus OM-D E-M5 Mark III
Olympus OM-D E-M10
Olympus OM-D E-M10 Mark II
Olympus OM-D E-M10 Mark III
Olympus OM-D E-M10 Mark IV
Olympus PEN E-P1
Olympus PEN E-P2
Olympus PEN E-P3
Olympus PEN E-P5
Olympus PEN E-PL1
Olympus PEN E-PL2
Olympus PEN E-PL3
Olympus PEN E-PL5
Olympus PEN E-PM1
Olympus PEN E-PM2
Olympus SP-320
Olympus SP-350
Olympus SP-510 UZ
Olympus SP-550 UZ
Olympus SP-570 UZ
Olympus Stylus 1
Olympus Stylus 1S
Olympus Tough TG-4
Olympus Tough TG-5
Olympus Tough TG-6
Olympus XZ-1
Olympus XZ-2
Olympus XZ-10

Panasonic 
Panasonic Lumix DMC-FX150
Panasonic Lumix DMC-FZ8
Panasonic Lumix DMC-FZ18
Panasonic Lumix DMC-FZ28
Panasonic Lumix DMC-FZ30
Panasonic Lumix DMC-FZ35
Panasonic Lumix DMC-FZ38
Panasonic Lumix DMC-FZ40
Panasonic Lumix DMC-FZ50
Panasonic Lumix DMC-FZ72
Panasonic Lumix DMC-FZ100
Panasonic Lumix DMC-FZ150
Panasonic Lumix DMC-FZ200 (Superzoom, released 2012)
Panasonic Lumix DMC-FZ300
Panasonic Lumix DMC-FZ1000
Panasonic Lumix DMC-L1
Panasonic Lumix DMC-L10
Panasonic Lumix DMC-LC1
Panasonic Lumix DMC-GM1
Panasonic Lumix DMC-GM5
Panasonic Lumix DMC-G1
Panasonic Lumix DMC-G2
Panasonic Lumix DMC-G3
Panasonic Lumix DMC-G5
Panasonic Lumix DMC-G6
Panasonic Lumix DMC-G7
Panasonic Lumix DMC-GF1
Panasonic Lumix DMC-GF2
Panasonic Lumix DMC-GF3
Panasonic Lumix DMC-GX1
Panasonic Lumix DMC-GX7
Panasonic Lumix DMC-GX8
Panasonic Lumix DMC-GX85
Panasonic Lumix DMC-GH1
Panasonic Lumix DMC-GH2
Panasonic Lumix DMC-GH3
Panasonic Lumix DMC-GH4
Panasonic Lumix DC-GH5
Panasonic Lumix DC-GH5S
Panasonic Lumix DMC-LX1
Panasonic Lumix DMC-LX2
Panasonic Lumix DMC-LX3
Panasonic Lumix DMC-LX5
Panasonic Lumix DMC-LX7

Pentax 
Pentax *ist D
Pentax *ist DL
Pentax *ist DL2
Pentax *ist DS
Pentax *ist DS2
Pentax 645D IR - DNG and PEF
Pentax 645D - DNG and PEF
Pentax 645Z - DNG and PEF 
Pentax K-01 - DNG and PEF
Pentax K100D Super
Pentax K100D
Pentax K10D - DNG and PEF
Pentax K110D
Pentax K2000/K-m
Pentax K200D
Pentax K20D - DNG and PEF
Pentax K-1 - DNG and PEF 
Pentax K-1 II - DNG and PEF 
Pentax K-3 - DNG and PEF 
Pentax K-3 II - DNG and PEF 
Pentax K-3 III - DNG and PEF
Pentax K-30 - DNG
Pentax K-5 II - DNG and PEF
Pentax K-5 IIs - DNG and PEF
Pentax K-5 - DNG and PEF
Pentax K-50 - DNG
Pentax K-500 - DNG
Pentax K-7 - DNG and PEF
Pentax K-r - DNG and PEF
Pentax K-S1
Pentax K-S2
Pentax K-x
Pentax MX-1
Pentax Q - DNG
Pentax Q10 - DNG
Pentax Q7 - DNG
Pentax Q-S1 - DNG

Phase One 
All Phase One Digital Backs

Polaroid 
Polaroid x530 (Foveon x3f format; develop in Sigma Photo Pro)

Ricoh 
Ricoh Caplio GX100
Ricoh GX200
Ricoh GR
Ricoh GR Digital
Ricoh GR Digital II
Ricoh GR Digital III
Ricoh GR Digital IV

Samsung 
Samsung GX-10 - DNG
Samsung GX-20 - DNG
Samsung Pro815
Samsung NX-M (Mini)
Samsung NX1
Samsung NX500
Samsung NX1000
Samsung NX100
Samsung NX200
Samsung NX300
Samsung NX30
Samsung NX20
Samsung NX10
Samsung WB5000
Samsung EX1
Samsung EX2F

Sigma 
Sigma DP1
Sigma DP1s
Sigma DP1x
Sigma DP2
Sigma DP2s
Sigma DP2x
Sigma FP
Sigma SD9
Sigma SD10
Sigma SD14
Sigma SD15
Sigma SD1 Merrill
Sigma DP1 Merrill
Sigma DP2 Merrill
Sigma DP3 Merrill
Sigma DP0 Quattro
Sigma DP1 Quattro
Sigma DP2 Quattro
Sigma DP3 Quattro
Sigma SD Quattro
Sigma SD Quattro H

Sony 
Sony DSLR-A100 - ARW 1.0 (lossless compression)
Sony DSLR-A200 - ARW 2.0 (lossless compression)
Sony DSLR-A230 - ARW 2.1 (lossless compression)
Sony DSLR-A290 - ARW 2.1 (lossless compression)
Sony DSLR-A300 - ARW 2.0 (lossless compression)
Sony DSLR-A330 - ARW 2.1 (lossless compression)
Sony DSLR-A350 - ARW 2.0 (lossless compression)
Sony DSLR-A380 - ARW 2.1 (lossless compression)
Sony DSLR-A390 - ARW 2.1 (lossless compression)
Sony DSLR-A450 - ARW 2.1 (lossy delta-compression)
Sony DSLR-A500 - ARW 2.1 (lossy delta-compression)
Sony DSLR-A550 - ARW 2.1 (lossy delta-compression)
Sony DSLR-A560 - ARW 2.2 (lossy delta-compression)
Sony DSLR-A580 - ARW 2.2 (lossy delta-compression)
Sony DSLR-A700 - ARW 2.0 (lossy delta-compression and 12-bit losslessly packed)
Sony DSLR-A850 - ARW 2.1 (lossy delta-compression and 12-bit losslessly packed)
Sony DSLR-A900 - ARW 2.1 (lossy delta-compression and 12-bit losslessly packed)
Sony SLT-A33 - ARW 2.2 (lossy delta-compression)
Sony SLT-A35 - ARW 2.2 (lossy delta-compression)
Sony SLT-A37 - ARW 2.3.0 (lossy delta-compression)
Sony SLT-A55 / Sony SLT-A55V - ARW 2.2 (lossy delta-compression)
Sony SLT-A57 - ARW 2.3.0 (lossy delta-compression)
Sony SLT-A58 - ARW 2.3.0 (lossy delta-compression)
Sony SLT-A65 / Sony SLT-A65V - ARW 2.3.0 (lossy delta-compression)
Sony SLT-A77 / Sony SLT-A77V - ARW 2.3.0 (lossy delta-compression)
Sony SLT-A99 / Sony SLT-A99V - ARW 2.3.0/2.3.1 (lossy delta-compression)
Sony ILCA-68 - ARW 2.3.1? (lossy delta-compression)
Sony ILCA-77M2 - ARW 2.3.1 (lossy delta-compression)
Sony ILCA-99M2 - ARW 2.3.2? (lossy delta-compression, 14-bit losslessy packed)
Sony NEX-3 / Sony NEX-3C - ARW 2.1/2.2 (lossy delta-compression)
Sony NEX-C3 - ARW 2.2 (lossy delta-compression)
Sony NEX-F3 - ARW 2.3.0 (lossy delta-compression)
Sony NEX-3N - ARW 2.3.0 (lossy delta-compression)
Sony NEX-5 / Sony NEX-5C - ARW 2.1/2.2 (lossy delta-compression)
Sony NEX-5N - ARW 2.2/2.3.0 (lossy delta-compression)
Sony NEX-5R - ARW 2.3.0/2.3.1 (lossy delta-compression)
Sony NEX-5T - ARW 2.3.1 (lossy delta-compression)
Sony NEX-6 - ARW 2.3.0/2.3.1 (lossy delta-compression)
Sony NEX-7 - ARW 2.3.0/2.3.1 (lossy delta-compression)
Sony ILCE-3000 - ARW 2.3.1 (lossy delta-compression)
Sony ILCE-3500 - ARW 2.3.1 (lossy delta-compression)
Sony ILCE-5000 - ARW 2.3.1 (lossy delta-compression)
Sony ILCE-5100 - ARW 2.3.1 (lossy delta-compression)
Sony ILCE-6000 - ARW 2.3.1 (lossy delta-compression)
Sony ILCE-6300 - ARW 2.3.2?
Sony ILCE-7 - ARW 2.3.1 (lossy delta-compression)
Sony ILCE-7R - ARW 2.3.1 (lossy delta-compression)
Sony ILCE-7S - ARW 2.3.1 (lossy delta-compression)
Sony ILCE-7M2 - ARW 2.3.1 (lossy delta-compression)
Sony ILCE-7RM2 - ARW 2.3.1/2.3.2? (lossy delta-compression, optional 14-bit losslessy packed)
Sony ILCE-7SM2 - ARW 2.3.2? (lossy delta-compression, 14-bit losslessy packed)
Sony ILCE-QX1 - ARW 2.3.1 (lossy delta-compression)
Sony Cyber-shot DSC-V3 - SRF
Sony Cyber-shot DSC-F828 - SRF
Sony Cyber-shot DSC-R1 - SR2
Sony Cyber-shot DSC-RX1 / Sony Cyber-shot DSC-RX1R - ARW 2.3.0/2.3.1 (lossy delta-compression)
Sony Cyber-shot DSC-RX10 - ARW 2.3.1 (lossy delta-compression)
Sony Cyber-shot DSC-RX10M2 - ARW 2.3.? (lossy delta-compression)
Sony Cyber-shot DSC-RX100 - ARW 2.3.0 (lossy delta-compression)
Sony Cyber-shot DSC-RX100M2 - ARW 2.3.1 (lossy delta-compression)
Sony Cyber-shot DSC-RX100M3 - ARW 2.3.1 (lossy delta-compression)
Sony Cyber-shot DSC-RX100M4 - ARW 2.3.? (lossy delta-compression)
Sony Handycam NEX-VG20 / Sony Handycam NEX-VG20E - ARW 2.3.0 (lossy delta-compression)
Sony Handycam NEX-VG30 / Sony Handycam NEX-VG30E - ARW 2.3.0 (lossy delta-compression)
Sony Handycam NEX-VG900 / Sony Handycam NEX-VG900E - ARW 2.3.0 (lossy delta-compression)
Sony XCD-SX710CR - (8 bit/10 bit)
Sony XCD-SX910CR - (8 bit/10 bit)

Native in-camera raw video support 
The following cameras allow audio and video to be shot in at least one raw (often similar to raw image format, but also with proprietary YCbCr and RGB coding and/or lossy wavelet compression) format.

AJA 
With AJA CamXChange software on OS-X Yosemite via Thunderbolt Port (DCI 4K to 30fps), CineDNG format.
With AJA CamXChange (or Possibly AJA Control Room - unconfirmed by owners) using AJA Io-4K in single or dual-link 3G-SDI (DCI 4K up to 60fps), or AJA Kona4 PCIe card to Raid Array (DCI 4K up to 120fps), all in CineDNG format.
AJA Cion

ARRI 
With proprietary ArriRaw and HDMI or HD-SDI uncompressed video format.
Arriflex D-20
Arriflex D-21
Arriflex Alexa, (Plus, M, Studio)

Z-Cam
Z-Cam E2
Z-Cam E2-M4
Z-Cam E2-S6
Z-Cam E2-F6
Z-Cam E2-F8

Blackmagic Design
Blackmagic Cinema Camera
Blackmagic Production Camera 4K 
Blackmagic Pocket Cinema Camera
Blackmagic Pocket Cinema Camera 4K
Blackmagic Pocket Cinema Camera 6K
Blackmagic Micro Cinema Camera (in sRAW reported as Lossy raw)
Blackmagic URSA
Blackmagic URSA Mini (and variants such as pro, 4.6k, 12k)

Bolex 
Digital Bolex D16 and D16m Monochrome, with open format CinemaDNG video raw format.

Canon
Cinema EOS C500, RAW 4K output.
Cinema EOS C200, Internal 4K RAW using the Cinema RAW Light Codec.
Unofficially, with the use of Magic Lantern software, the following EOS cameras can record RAW video:
5D Mark III
5D Mark II
7D
6D
70D
60D
50D
100D
700D
650D
600D
550D
500D
1200D
EOS M

DALSA 
Dalsa Origin 1&2, Company was acquired by Arriflex

Ikonoskop 
A-Cam dII, with open format CinemaDNG video raw format.

Kinefinity 
KineRAW-S35,  records in both CineForm and CinemaDNG.
KineRAW-MINI, internally records CinemaDNG but can also externally output CineForm.
KineMINI 4K,  internally records lossless KineRAW (.krw) codec as well as CineForm.
KineMAX 6K,  internally records lossless KineRAW (.krw) codec as well as CineForm.
TERRA 6K,  internally records lossless KineRAW (.krw) codec.
TERRA 4K,  with firmware updated to KineOS 6.11 TERRA 4K can record with open format CinemaDNG.
MAVO,  reported to have both internal recording with the lossless KineRAW (.krw) codec as well as CinemaDNG.
MAVO LF,   reported to have both internal recording with the lossless KineRAW (.krw) codec as well as CinemaDNG.

RED 
With proprietary REDCODE raw format with lossy compression for video.
RED ONE
RED EPIC
RED Scarlet-X

Panasonic 
Varicam Pure

Sony 
Sony F65
Sony F55 (with adapter)
Sony F5 (with adapter)
Sony NXCAM NEX-FS700 / Sony NXCAM NEX-FS700R, with firmware 3 plus AXS-R5 or HXR-IFR5 or Convergent Design Odyssey 7Q(+)
Sony VENICE, with some resolutions requiring an AXS-R7 external recorder
Sony XDCAM PXW-FS7, with XDCA-FS7 plus AXS-R5 or HXR-IFR5 or external recorder (4K/2K raw recording)

Uncompressed video output via HDMI

Nikon
Nikon D4 
Nikon D4S
Nikon D5
Nikon D800/D800E 
Nikon D810/D810A
Nikon D600 
Nikon D610 
Nikon D7100 
Nikon D5200
Nikon D5300
Nikon D750 
Nikon D5500
Nikon D7200
Nikon D500
Nikon D850

Other 
Some Nikon Coolpix cameras which are not advertised as supporting a RAW image format can actually produce usable raw files if switched to a maintenance mode. Note that switching to this mode can invalidate a camera's guarantee. Nikon models with this capability:

E700, E800, E880, E900, E950, E990, E995, E2100, E2500, E3700, E4300, E4500.

Some Canon PowerShot cameras with DiGiC II and certain DiGiC III image processors which are not advertised as supporting a RAW format can actually produce usable raw files with an unofficial open-source firmware add-on by some users.

The Nokia N900 mobile phone has an add on app "Fcam", which allows capture and saving of RAW files in Adobe's DNG format (along with other advanced features usually found in DSLRs).
In 2013, Nokia launched Nokia Lumia 1520 and Nokia Lumia 1020 smartphones with DNG RAW format.

Samsung Galaxy Note 5, Note 7, Galaxy S6 Edge+, S7 and S7 Edge also support RAW image capture. Not to mention LG G4, LG G5, iPhone 6s (Plus), iPhone SE, iPhone 7 (Plus) iPad Pro and some other modern phones - OnePlus One, OnePlus Two, OnePlus 3(T), etc.

See also 
 Raw image format

References

External links
 DCRAW List of supported cameras at the end, all of them support raw format.

Digital photography
Technology-related lists